Manaswini is a 1968 Indian Malayalam-language film, directed by P. Bhaskaran and written by Parappurath. The film stars Sathyan, Madhu, Sarada and Sukumari. It is based on Sanskar Lakshmi, a play written by Prafulla Desai. The film was released on 13 April 1960.

Plot

Cast 

Sathyan
Madhu
Sharada
Sukumari
Thikkurissy Sukumaran Nair
P. J. Antony
Bahadoor
C. A. Balan
Khadeeja
Meena
Nellikode Bhaskaran

Soundtrack 
The music was composed by M. S. Baburaj and the lyrics were written by P. Bhaskaran.

References

External links 
 

1960s Malayalam-language films
1968 films
Films directed by P. Bhaskaran
Indian films based on plays